Ghassan Faddoul (born 1 September 1955) is a Lebanese athlete. He competed in the men's long jump and the men's javelin throw at the 1976 Summer Olympics.

References

1955 births
Living people
Athletes (track and field) at the 1976 Summer Olympics
Lebanese male long jumpers
Lebanese male javelin throwers
Olympic athletes of Lebanon
Place of birth missing (living people)